John Chaunceys (fl. 1390s) of Bath, Somerset, was an English politician.

He was a Member (MP) of the Parliament of England for Bath in September 1397 and 1399.

References

Year of birth missing
Year of death missing
English MPs September 1397
English MPs 1399
14th-century English politicians
People from Bath, Somerset